The first bus rapid transit in Brazil (BRT) was built in 1974 in the city of Curitiba by the then mayor, architect Jaime Lerner, and became the second BRT in the world. The goal of the system is to provide high quality rail transit service to customers and at a comparable cost to that of a bus transit. Curitiba's success inspired the implementation of similar plans in more than 100 cities around the world, including the Brazilian cities of São Paulo, Rio de Janeiro, Belo Horizonte, Porto Alegre, Manaus, Goiânia, Aracaju, Salvador, Recife, and Brasília.

BRT systems by city

Belo Horizonte

Belo Horizonte's BRT program was the main transportation project the city had for the 2014 FIFA World Cup. The Move system debuted in March 2014.

Brasília
The first BRT line, the "Eixo Sul" (Santa Maria/Gama), began testing operations in April 2014. The construction of the "Eixo EPTG" (Taguatinga) was partially concluded in 2013, but it is not in operation due to lack of the appropriate bus fleet.

Cuiabá
The construction of the BRT line Cuiabá International Airport/CPA will provide the main link road and public transportation between the airport, the administrative area, hotels and downtown Cuiabá. The stretch of the BRT corridor Airport/CPA is also the main axis of travel demand between Várzea Grande and Cuiabá and between the region northeast of Cuiabá to the city center, which has the largest concentration of population.

The Mario Andreazza road corridor will link BRT transport, the BR-163, BR-364 and BR-070 with Várzea Grande and Cuiabá. It will link the new Verdão stadium with the Training Center and the Corridor of Miguel Sutil.

The design of the BRT Coxipó/Center links the southeast of the city with the central area, which will connect with the BRT Airport/CPA. Connecting the two corridors will facilitate access to hospitals and hotels and also the future training center for World Cup matches in 2014, located in BR-456, Highway of Immigrants.

Curitiba

Curitiba's Rede Integrada de Transporte (integrated transportation network) was the second BRT system implemented in the world, and began operations in 1974. Curitiba's has been the model for the design and implementation of many BRT systems around the world.

Fortaleza
The project BRT to Alberto Craveiro Avenue will cover the completion of link road between the hotel industry to Fortaleza's main stadium Castelão, aiming to improve the traffic of people during the 2014 FIFA World Cup. The services will consist of drainage, earthwork, paving, urbanization, road signage and landscaping, among others. Are included in the cost of the project, the actions necessary to extend the route, which will be four lanes of traffic to the Castelão Stadium.

With the completion of the work of the link road between the 3rd ring blood passing through the main access channel City Regional (BR-116), the Stadium of Castelão through system of BRT. The services will consist of drainage, earthwork, paving, urbanization, road signage and landscaping, among others. Costs of extending track are included in the project.

Dedé Brasil Avenue, represents the main link road between the road and metro terminal for passengers in Parangaba and Castelão Stadium. The project will increase the boulevard's hourly capacity from 2,700 to 4,000 units. The works will consist of drainage, earthwork, paving, urbanization, road signage and landscaping, among other activities. The project BRT to Avenida Raul Barbosa involves the completion of link road between the hotel area to the city's main stadium,  Castelão.

Goiânia
Since the 1970's Goiânia counts with a vast BRT line called Eixo Anhaguera ran by Metrobus. This 14 km line runs alongside Avenida Anhanguera with terminals situated in Bairro Ipiranga, Novo Mundo, Leste Universitário, Central, dos Funcionário transporting about 300 thousand people daily. In 2014 more lines that connect Goiânia to Trindade, Senador Canedo and Goianira were added to the system. The BRT lines are also used by emergency vehicles, such as ambulances and police cars.

São Paulo
São Paulo has one of the most extensive networks of bus exclusive lanes in the world with 129 km over 10 lines.  The development of the BRT system has seen a reversal in 30 year decline of public transport's share of trips, up from 44.7% in 2002 up to 55.7% in 2007.   While the system lacks platform level boarding normally associated with BRT, the exclusive lanes offer a high average speed of almost 20 km/h and 3,164,000 passengers a day were carried in 2013.

See also: Expresso Tiradentes and  Metropolitano ABD

Rio de Janeiro

The Corridor T5 represents the first cross-connection of large-capacity public transport in Rio de Janeiro, integrating pre-existing radial transport routes. According to data from the Municipal Transportation in Rio de Janeiro, the project is completed and the work will be performed by the municipal government of Rio The system will be deployed along roads with high volume of travel by bus, linking the Rio de Janeiro International Airport to Barra da Tijuca through the Penha. The system includes three bus rapid transit corridors. TransOeste opened in 2012, TransCarioca in 2014, and TransOlimpica is in 2016.

The Corridor is planned as a T5 trunk-feeder system with central station and bus door on the left, segregated from general traffic, with interruptions at intersections. The stations have platforms at a height of 90 centimeters, at a level with the bus steps. Payment of fare and ticket validation is carried out at stations and terminals to minimize embarkation/disembarkation time and increase the commercial speed of the system.

The road has physical and tariff integration with high capacity axial lines of the municipality: Branches Deodoro, Belford Roxo and Saracuruna (train) and Line 2 (Rio de Janeiro Metro). According to the municipal government, the T5 will be served by bus lines and complementary feeding. The feeder lines are shorter, connecting the T5 corridor with the neighborhoods located in the area of influence of the route. Additional lines are longer, linking the T5 Corridor to downtown and major sub-urban areas (Zona Sul, Meier, Saens Pena etc.).

Altogether, routes are 28 km (17.3 mi)long, with two lines: Express and Parador, and two terminals: Alvorada and Penha. There are six double stations (express lanes and Parador) Autódromo, Taquara, Tanque, Praça Seca, Madureira and Vicente de Carvalho, and thirty simple stations, serving only Parador lines.

Porto Alegre
For its geographical location, bounded by the lake to the west and south and east by hills, conditioned the distribution of urbanization basically a single axle, towards the north, and therefore this axis have focused the main highways and railroads. Along them flourished many cities in the metropolitan area.
The transport sector is managed by the Enterprise of Public Transportation and Circulation (EPTC – Empresa Pública de Transporte e Circulação in Portuguese). The population is served by a fleet of 1,592 buses and 403 minibuses. The bus lines serve in 364, carrying around 1.1 million passengers per day. These buses, 371 have adaptations for people with physical disabilities and 527 (in 2011, September) have air conditioning. The travel stocking in 46 lines, leading 56,000 passengers per day. The school bus fleet serves 392 schools and 15,824 students enrolled.
Carris has the most comfortable buses. Almost all of the buses have air-conditioning, automatic gearbox (with overdrive), anti-locking brake system (ABS) and even an "ecologic engine", with less pollution.

Recife
The deployment of the high transport capacity BRT (Bus Rapid Transit) in the East-West Corridor in Recife will bring greater mobility, security and comfort for users of the system of public passenger transport in the Metropolitan Region of Recife. According to the Government of Pernambuco State, which is responsible for the construction, design, the link includes Caxangá Avenue, through the UR-7 with the City Cup, a stretch of 3 km (1.8 mi) in São Lourenço da Mata. In this region, the BRT will service both the integrated terminal and the subway station Camaragibe, which is the future terminal and of São Lourenço metro station.

The construction of the BRT North-South, which will carry passengers in the stretch Igarassu/Joana Bezerra/Center of Recife. With 15 km (9.3 mi) long, it will have connection with the projects Caxangá Corridor East-West Corridor Route Mangue.

Salvador
It is 21 km (13 mi) from the Salvador International Airport to the Retiro, via Paralela Avenue, through the Iguatemi Mall, the Metro station at the Accesso Norte to the Retiro. This is the section approved and awarded federal funds through loans made by the State. The construction started in 2010 and is scheduled to end in 2012. The BRT is planned with biarticulated buses and articulated buses with a capacity of carrying up to 270 people, a modern transportation, safe, fast, efficient travels in exclusive channels and stop at stations with computerized control system and high technology in all services.

These 21 km (13 mi) is first stage, between International Airport and Accesso Norte Metro station/Retiro, via the central plot Paralela Avenue. There are 23 points of embarkation and disembarkation in new stations, ten new footbridges and 12 extensions, 15 flyovers, three bridges. The system reduces the average waiting time for buses from 18 to three minutes. This is the first step of a system planned for 127 km (78.9 mi) of roads with the integration to the metro trains to the suburbs, the Atlantic beaches and the North Coast, contemplating a future throughout the metropolitan area.

The BRT in Salvador occurred because of rapid deployment, a much lower cost than other systems, and easy integration of physical infrastructure with the road system. Salvador BRT will come with all the technology previously deployed in major cities like London. Cars will have double doors, automatic and wide to the left of the cars, stations with raised floors ensuring easy access for all, including the disabled, fare collection in booths outside, and the movement of vehicles will occur on highways that allow overtaking stations, ending queues. All planned to offer maximum safety and comfort. The International Airport/Iguatemi Mall route, for example, has three types of operating vehicles: the express, direct, faster, without stopping in the path, the semi-express, which will make a few stops along the line, only three or four in the path, and the local parador, stopping at all points/stations of the route.

See also
 Implementation of bus rapid transit by country
 List of bus rapid transit systems

References